Lawrence Tico Majawa (born 13 March 1980) is a Malawian footballer playing for Mighty Wanderers in the Malawi Premier Division and the Malawi national football team.

Career
Majawa began his professional football career in his native Malawi with Mighty Wanderers. Spending eight years with the Blantyre club, he would carve his name into the club history books by leading them to the FISD Challenge Cup (Malawi's FA Cup) and then the Premier Division title in back to back seasons. In 2008 he jumped ship to the Botswana Premier League with Township Rollers and became an instant success, winning seven trophies in nine years with the club before leaving the club after refusing to take a pay cut. Majawa then spent two seasons at fierce rivals Mochudi Centre Chiefs before returning to Mighty Wanderers in 2019.

Honours

Club
 Mighty Wanderers
Malawi Premier Division:1
2006
FISD Challenge Cup:1
2005
 Township Rollers
Botswana Premier League:5
2009-10, 2010-11, 2013-14, 2015-16, 2016-17
FA Cup:1
2010
Mascom Top 8 Cup:1
2011-12

Individual
Botswana Premier League Player of the Month: November 2015
FUB Team of the Year: 2016

References

Malawian footballers
1980 births
Living people
Association football midfielders
Malawi international footballers
Malawian expatriate footballers
Expatriate footballers in Botswana